Tim Lang may refer to:

 Timothy Lang (born 1985), Australian basketball player
 Timothy Lang Sr., New Hampshire politician
 Tim Lang (nutritionist) (born 1948), professor of food policy
 Tim Lang (cricketer) (born 1981), Australian cricketer